Renato Hyshmeri (born 4 March 1989) is an Albanian professional footballer who plays as a midfielder for Albanian First Division club Elbasani.

Club career

Partizani Tirana
On 23 July 2013, Hyshmeri joined newly promoted side Partizani Tirana on a free transfer, signing a contract which kept him at the club until July 2015. During the course of 2013–14 season, Hyshmeri appeared 25 league matches and 4 cup matches, scoring 4 goals, as Partizani finished 5th in the championship and was eliminated in the second round of 2013–14 Albanian Cup.

Tirana
Hyshmeri become a free agent after his departure from Partizani, and on 22 August 2014, completed a transfer to with their archrivals Tirana by signing a one-year contract ahead of the 2014–15 Albanian Superliga season.  He made his debut just two days later in the opening game of the season in a 3–0 home win over Apolonia Fier, where he came on as an 81st-minute substitute and scored his first goal for the club. Following the match, Hyshmeri dedicated the goal to his coach Gugash Magani for "believing" in him and "giving him the opportunity" to debut in the match. He featured in 22 league games and scored twice during the 2014–15 season, but he only made 9 starts, as he was mainly used as a substitute by the head coach Magani. He left the club once his contract expired at the end of the season after making 28 appearances in all competitions and scoring two goals.

Bylis Ballsh
After leaving Tirana in the summer of 2015, he became a free agent and eventually signed a two-year contract with newly promoted Albanian Superliga side Bylis Ballsh on 24 July 2015. Hyshmeri made his debut on 23 August in team's opening league match of the season against Kukësi, starting and playing 63 minutes in an eventual 2–0 away defeat. From March 2016 to April 2016, Hyshmeri didn't play in any match and wasn't even on the bench. It was reported that he didn't train at all. It was alluded that relationship between Hyshmeri and club's directors was broken and Hyshmeri was towards departure. However he returned to the field on 25 April in the match against Laçi and concluded his first season by making 32 appearances between league and cup, as Bylis was relegated after one season.

Elbasani return
In September 2017, Hyshmeri returned to his boyhood club Elbasani, now at the third tier to give his contribution for the promotion of the team. On 8 October 2017, in the second matchday against Albpetrol, angry with a referee decision, Hyshmeri was sent off for unsportsmanlike conduct on referee. Disciplinary Committee suspended him with 10 matches.

Trepça'89
On 7 July 2018, Hyshmeri was presented as the new player of Football Superleague of Kosovo's Trepça'89, rejoining his former manager Gugash Magani.

KF Dukagjini
In July 2019 Hyshmeri joined KF Dukagjini.

International career
Hyshmeri has represent Albania at youth level, playing for under-19. He made his competitive debut with under-19 side on 18 October 2007 in a match against Spain valid for first qualifying round of UEFA European Under-19 Championship.

Career statistics

References

External links
FSHF profile
 

1989 births
Living people
Footballers from Elbasan
Albanian footballers
Albania youth international footballers
Association football midfielders
KF Elbasani players
KF Teuta Durrës players
FK Partizani Tirana players
KF Tirana players
KF Bylis Ballsh players
KF Trepça'89 players
Kategoria Superiore players
Kategoria e Parë players
Kategoria e Dytë players
Football Superleague of Kosovo players
Albanian expatriate footballers
Expatriate footballers in Kosovo
Albanian expatriate sportspeople in Kosovo